Love for a Thousand More is a South Korea web series starring Kang Seung-yoon and Hwang Seung-eon. The drama is aired every Monday, Wednesday and Friday at 11:00 (KST) starting from December 5, 2016 till December 23, 2016 on Naver TV Cast (South Korea), YG Entertainment's YouTube Channel (International) and Miaopai (China).

Synopsis 

Story about a 1,000-year-old woman named Pyeon Mi-jo (Hwang Seung-eon), who became immortal after she met a certain unidentified man. She has been offering her love counseling services to people based on her experiences over the past 1,000 years, until she finds true love with Yoo Jun-woo (Kang Seung-yoon) who is the leader of the hip-hop crew Krunk Soul.

Cast

Main 
 Kang Seung-yoon as Yoo Jun-woo
 Kim Jung-chul as young Jun-woo
 Hwang Seung-eon as Pyeon Mi-jo

Supporting

People Around Jun-woo & Mi-jo
 Kim Hee-jung as Yeon-ji
 Kim Jin-woo as Hyung-sik
 Jang Ki-yong as Jason

Mythomania Group Therapy Members 
Kim Yong-hwan as Doctor Lee Dong-hyun
Bae Jung-nam as Man with Breast Cancer
Kim Do-yeon as Fiona
Kim Young as NASA Alien Research Team Member

Others 
Kim Ah-ri as Jun-woo's Mother
Park Se-jin as Female College Student
Ha Kyung-min as Jang Young-shil
Lee Seung-joon as Lee Yi
Kim Jin-ho as Mi-jo's Past Guy 1
Han Eun-joon as Mi-jo's Past Guy 2
Yang Dae-sung as Mi-jo's Past Guy 3
Lee Jong-sung as Mi-jo's Past Guy in Photo
Yoo Jung-ho as Bingsoo Shop's Boss
Kim Min-sung as Fish Cake Shop's Boss
Yoo Sung-yeol as Japanese Food Shop's Staff
Yoon Joon-ho as Guy at Funeral Hall
Hwang Jae-pil as Engineering Student
Jung Han-sol as Girl that Confessed to Jun-woo
Jo Eun-seo as Counselling Girl 1
Shim So-young as Counselling Girl 2
Heo In-beom as Student 1
Yoo Soo-bin as Student 2
Gong Byung-joon as Doctor at Emergency Room
Kim Il-suk as Doctor Wang
Lee Myung-ja as Grandmother
Kim Tak-ho as Motorcycle Guy
Choi Ji-young as Mi-jo's Accident Stand-in

Cameo 
Kal So-won as Counselling Girl 3
C Jamm as Audition Participant 1
Pharoh as Audition Participant 2
Microdot as Guest Rapper for Krunk Soul

Original soundtracks

References

External links 
 Love for a Thousand More on HanCinema

South Korean drama web series
2016 web series debuts
2016 web series endings
Naver TV original programming